The Pakal Dul Dam is an under construction concrete-face rock-fill dam on the Marusudar river, a tributary of the Chenab River, in Kishtwar district of the Indian Jammu and Kashmir. The primary purpose of the dam is hydroelectric power generation. In February 2014, the project was awarded to a consortium of domestic and foreign countries. It includes AFCONS, JP Prakash Associate Bharat Heavy Electricals. Pakistan, which relies on the Chenab downstream, views the dam as a violation of the Indus Water Treaty, whereas India states it is as per treaty provisions. Indian Commentator Harshil Mehta wrote that the project holds strategic interest for India, apart from utilising just Hydropower, along with Kiru and Ratle, and Ujh multipurpose project.

See also

Baglihar Dam – located downstream

References

Dams in Jammu and Kashmir
Dams on the Chenab River
Hydroelectric power stations in Jammu and Kashmir
Kishtwar district
Gravity dams

Dams under construction
Dam controversies